Ebrechtella tricuspidata is a species of crab spiders belonging to the family Thomisidae.

Subspecies
Subspecies include: 
 Ebrechtella tricuspidata tricuspidata (Fabricius, 1775) - Palearctic realm
 Ebrechtella tricuspidata concolor (Caporiacco, 1935) - Karakorum

Distribution
This species is widespread in the Palearctic realm (Europe, Turkey, Caucasus, Russia to Central Asia, China, Korea, and Japan). It is not found in Great Britain.

Habitat
These medium-sized crab spiders inhabit dry meadows and sunny forest edges, waiting for prey well camouflaged in flower and foliage.

Description
The cephalothorax (Prosoma) is light green in females, with sometimes indeterminate reddish markings on the back of the whitish-yellowish abdomen. These reddish markings usually consist of two broad rear-connected bands. Also legs are light green.

Males are clearly different-looking (sexual dimorphism). They have light brown cephalothorax with bright median stripe and the first two pairs of legs, while the bottle-shaped abdomen (Opisthosoma) is usually pale green, laterally with dark brown markings.

Biology
Adults from both sexes can be found in May and June.

Gallery

References

Thomisidae
Spiders described in 1775
Taxa named by Johan Christian Fabricius